The Women's Chinese Basketball Association (WCBA) is the first-tier professional women's basketball league in China. It was established in 2002 as the women's counterpart to the Chinese Basketball Association (CBA).

Current clubs 
There are currently 17 teams in the league. Team names often incorporate the names of their corporate sponsors.

List of WCBA champions 

2002 - Bayi Kylin
2003 - Bayi Kylin
2004 - Bayi Kylin
2005 - Bayi Kylin
2006 - Liaoning Golden Leopards
2007 - Liaoning Golden Leopards
2008 - Bayi Kylin
2009 - Liaoning Golden Leopards
2010 - Liaoning Golden Leopards
2011 - Shenyang Army Golden Lions
2012 - Beijing Great Wall
2013 - Shanxi Flame
2014 - Shanxi Flame
2015 - Shanxi Flame
2016 - Beijing Great Wall
2017 - Beijing Great Wall
2018 - Beijing Great Wall
2019 - Guangdong Vermilion Birds
2020 - Season canceled due to COVID-19
2021 - Inner Mongolia Rural Credit Union
2022 - Inner Mongolia Rural Credit Union
2023 - Sichuan Yuanda Pandas

Players with the most championships
7 × champions: Zhang Yu (from 3 teams)
6 × champions: Yang Banban (from 2 teams)
5 × champions: Zhang Wei (from 2 teams), Sui Feifei, Chen Nan, Ren Lei, Zhang Xiaoni, Chen Lisha

WNBA All-Stars in WCBA history 

 Nicky Anosike
 Kelsey Bone
 DeWanna Bonner
 Kara Braxton
 Jessica Breland
 Liz Cambage
 Swin Cash
 Tamika Catchings
 Tina Charles
 Stefanie Dolson
 Candice Dupree
 Sylvia Fowles
 Yolanda Griffith
 Brittney Griner
 Lauren Jackson
 Glory Johnson
 Asjha Jones
 Jonquel Jones
 Crystal Langhorne
 Betty Lennox
 Jewell Loyd
 Chasity Melvin
 Maya Moore
 Chiney Ogwumike
 Nneka Ogwumike
 Candace Parker
 Ruth Riley
 Tangela Smith
 Breanna Stewart
 Penny Taylor
 DeMya Walker
 Adrian Williams-Strong
 Elizabeth Williams
 A'ja Wilson
 Sophia Young

See also 

 Women's sports
 Sport in China
 China women's national basketball team
 Chinese Basketball Association (CBA)
 National Basketball League (NBL)
 Chinese University Basketball Association (CUBA)

References

External links 
 Women's Basketball and WCBA
 Changes in the CBA and WCBA in the 2004-2005 season 
 2004-2005 season full results: scoring by quarter, match summaries, etc. 
 2004-2005 playoff results 

 
Basketball leagues in China
Women's basketball leagues in Asia
Women's basketball competitions in China
Sports leagues established in 2002
2002 establishments in China
Professional sports leagues in China